Sagdodonacus was an Iranian officer, who served as the governor of Characene from  to 164 BC under suzerainty of the Frataraka rulers of Persis. He was the father of Hyspaosines.

Name 
The name of Sagdodonacus ("to hold, to keep") is seemingly Bactrian and he was presumably of Bactrian origin himself. He was called Saxt in the accounts of the 10th-century historian Hamza al-Isfahani.

Biography 

The Frataraka rulers of Persis were local rulers subject to the Seleucid Empire since the 2nd-century BC. After the death of Antiochus III the Great in 187 BC, however, Seleucid rule weakened in its southern provinces, which allowed Persis under Wahbarz to not only declare independence, but also expand over the region of Characene, appointing Sagdodonacus as its governor. The precise date of the Persis conquest of Characene and Sagdodonacus' appointment is unknown. It may have been in the summer 184 BC, when Seleucid authority over its southern provinces seem to have been further weakened.

In 164 BC, during the reign of Antiochus IV Epiphanes, Seleucid authority was re-established over Persis and Characene. The expedition was led by the Seleucid general Noumenios, who replaced Sagdodonacus as the governor of Characene. The fate of Sagdodonacus afterwards remains unknown; he was survived by his son Hyspaosines, who served as the Seleucid governor of Characene, and later declared independence, creating a principality in the region, which would last till 222 when it was incorporated by the Sasanian Empire.

References

Sources
 
 
 
 
 
 .
 

2nd-century BC Iranian people
2nd-century BC deaths
Year of birth unknown
Bactria